The Love Cove Group is a metamorphosed volcaniclastic sedimentary group cropping out in southeastern Newfoundland.

References

Neoproterozoic Newfoundland and Labrador